In the United States, the current Golden Age of Television (also known as Peak TV or Prestige TV) is a period widely regarded as being marked by a large number of "high quality", internationally acclaimed television programs.

Named in reference to the original Golden Age of Television of the 1950s, the period has also been referred to as the "New", "Second", or "Third Golden Age of Television". The various names reflect disagreement over whether shows of the 1980s and early-mid 1990s belong to a since-concluded golden era or to the current one. The contemporary period is generally identified as beginning in 1999 with The Sopranos, with some dispute as to whether the age ended in the mid-late 2010s or early 2020s, or remains ongoing.

It is believed to have resulted from advances in media distribution technology, digital TV technology (including HDTV, online video platforms, TV streaming, video-on-demand, and web TV), and a large increase in the number of hours of available television, which has prompted a major wave of content creation.

History

Origins and early era

French scholar Alexis Pichard has argued that television enjoyed a Second Golden Age starting in the 2000s which was a combination of three elements: first, an improvement in both visual aesthetics and storytelling; second, an overall homogeneity between cable series and networks series; and third, a tremendous popular success. Pichard contends that this Second Golden Age was the result of a revolution initiated by the traditional networks in the 1980s and carried on by the cable channels (especially HBO) in the 1990s. Film director Francis Ford Coppola thinks that the second golden age of television comes from "kids" with their "little father's camcorder", who wanted to make films like he did in the 1970s but were not permitted to, so they did it for television.

The new Golden Age brought creator-driven tragic dramas of the 2000s and 2010s, including 1999's The Sopranos and The West Wing; 2001's Six Feet Under and 24; 2002's The Wire and The Shield, 2004's Deadwood, Lost and Battlestar Galactica; 2005's Grey's Anatomy and Avatar: The Last Airbender; 2006's Friday Night Lights; 2007's Mad Men; 2008's Breaking Bad; 2011's Game of Thrones; and 2013's House of Cards. Others appear in the Writers Guild of America vote for 101 Best Written TV Shows. Production values got higher than ever before on shows such as Mad Men, Breaking Bad, and Homeland to the point of rivaling cinema, while anti-heroic series like The Sopranos and The Wire were cited as improving television content thus earning critical praise.

Stephanie Zacharek of The Village Voice has argued that the current golden age began earlier with over-the-air broadcast shows like Babylon 5, Star Trek: Deep Space Nine (both of which premiered in 1993), and Buffy the Vampire Slayer (1997). TV critic Alan Sepinwall cites shows such as Buffy and Oz (which both first aired in 1997) as ushering in the golden age. Will Gompertz of the BBC believes that Friends, which debuted in 1994, might stake a claim as the opening bookend show of the period. Matt Zoller Seitz argues that it began in the 1980s with Hill Street Blues (1981) and St. Elsewhere (1982). Kirk Hamilton of Kotaku has said that Avatar: The Last Airbender (2005) should be considered a part of the golden age of television, and recommended "the sophisticated kids show" to others. With the rise of instant access to content on Netflix, creator-driven television shows like Breaking Bad, The Shield (2002), Friday Night Lights (2006) and Mad Men gained loyal followings that grew to become widely popular. The success of instant access to television shows was presaged by the popularity of DVDs, and continues to increase with the rise of digital platforms and online companies.

The Golden Age of television is believed to have resulted from advances in media distribution technology, digital TV technology (including HDTV, online video platforms, TV streaming, video-on-demand, and web TV), and a large increase in the number of hours of available television, which has prompted a major wave of content creation. The increase in the number of shows is also cited as evidence of a Golden Age, or "peak TV". In the five years between 2011 and 2016, the number of scripted television shows, on broadcast, cable and digital platforms increased by 71%. In 2002, 182 television shows aired, while 2016 had 455 original scripted television shows and 495 in 2018. The number of shows are rising largely due to companies like Netflix, Amazon Video and Hulu investing heavily in original content. The number of shows aired by online service increased from only one in 2009 to over 93 in 2016.

Late era and potential end

An increasing reliance on rebooting and reviving existing franchises led to widespread belief that the Golden Age of Television was ending in the late 2010s, with the caveat that some of these reboots (such as DuckTales, Girl Meets World and One Day at a Time) share the positive reception and mature character development of original shows of the era. Viewership patterns in 2020 shifted rapidly toward reruns. To address burnout from binge watching and concerns that the practice makes television more disposable and forgettable, streaming providers reduced their reliance on the practice in the early 2020s by returning to a more traditional model of releasing one new episode a week. A showrunner for an unnamed series on Netflix, a platform that has been especially aggressive toward releasing full seasons at once as a company policy, commented that the volume of existing content has made it more difficult to devote the time to binge watching.

A 2021 interview of social media influencers noted that the teen sitcoms and teen dramas from the early Golden Age, driven by continued presence in reruns and video-on-demand platforms, have stronger followings among Generation Z than contemporary shows; they feel that the latter are more geared toward pre-teens or adults instead of teenagers, try too hard to appeal to current trends, and lack a sense of familiarity compared to shows that have been around since they were born. This is attributed as a cause for the increasing number of reboots and revivals of shows from early in the era.

Ed Power of the Irish Examiner opines that "the sun began to set" on the golden age between 2013 and 2015, with the finales of Breaking Bad and Mad Men, and "Since then, television has reverted to its older tradition of quantity over quality." Siobhan Lyons of The Conversation believes the 2022 finale of Better Call Saul marks the end of "the last of those defining, golden age shows," in a time increasingly oversaturated with streaming content and viewing options. NPR noted in May 2022 that although television executives had predicted a peak in television series since the mid-2010s, the number of series continued to grow into the early 2020s, from 400 original productions across broadcast, cable and major streaming outlets in 2015 to 559 in 2021. The network noted that the major streamers, with the exception of Disney+ (which NPR attributed to the company's strong brand recognition), were seeing diminishing quality and, particularly in the case of Netflix, declining popularity. HBO Max made a substantial cut to its library in August 2022, mostly to its children's television series, out of concerns that the quantity of content on the service (especially with its pending merger with Discovery+) was becoming overwhelming and difficult to find, and that the children's programming was not driving subscriptions or views on the service.

Around 2019, a period of intense competition began for market share among streaming services, a period known as the streaming wars. This competition was increased during the first two years of the COVID-19 pandemic as more people stayed home and watched TV. Many services attempted to compete on quality. The streaming wars, combined with the decline of the popularity of mainstream films (along with said mainstream films increasingly relying on franchises that are less likely to garner awards), and the rise of independent films winning major film awards within the last six years, resulted in a historical first — the first film from a streaming service to produce an Academy Award winner for Best Picture: Apple TV's CODA (a Sundance-winning film about the only hearing member of a deaf family struggling for fame) over Netflix's contender the Jane Campion-directed Western The Power of the Dog at the 94th Academy Awards. The streaming wars were largely recognized to have ended in 2022, as the major streamers lost subscribers and shifted their focus to profit over market share by raising subscription fees, cutting production budgets, cracking down on password sharing, and introducing ad-supported tiers.

Characteristics and criticism

Characteristics of this golden age are complicated characters who may be morally ambiguous or antiheroes, questionable behavior, complex plots, positive diverse perspectives, and often forays into R-rated territory.

Genres of television associated with this golden age include dramas (especially ones originating on cable and digital platforms; some being called "peak bleak" due to the extremely pessimistic nature of shows like Succession and Game of Thrones); sitcoms (especially ones that use comedy-drama which some critics would call "sadcoms"), single-camera setup, or adult animation; sketch comedy (especially series linked to alternative comedy); and late-night talk shows (especially ones that emphasize news satire).

A key characteristic of the golden age is serialization, where a continuous story arc stretches over multiple episodes or seasons. Traditional American television had an episodic format, with each episode typically consisting of a self-contained story. During the golden age, there has been a transition to a serialization format, with a continuous story arc stretching over multiple episodes or seasons. John R. Ziegler and Leah Richards note that the serialization format was previously already a key defining characteristic of Japanese anime shows, notably the popular Dragon Ball Z (1989), which distinguished them from American television shows at the time. Serialization later also became a key defining characteristic of American live-action television shows during the golden age.

The era is not without criticism: alongside the limited audience appeal of shows featuring unlikeable characters and too many showrunners embracing the "12-hour movie" structure of stories, the number of original shows being produced has some, like FX CEO John Landgraf and Times TV critic Judy Berman, worried about overwhelming the viewing audience to the point of what the latter called "peak redundancy". Author Daniel Kelley claimed that this was also the Golden Age of bad TV with shows such as Zoo, Under the Dome and The I-Land. Derek Thompson of The Atlantic stated that TV replaced movies as "elite entertainment".

Notable and important people associated with Peak TV
Showrunners

J. J. Abrams
Judd Apatow 
Fred Armisen
Alan Ball
Rachel Bloom
Steven Bochco
Charlie Brooker
Bo Burnham
David Chase
Sam Esmail
David Fincher
Vince Gilligan
Matt Groening
Bill Hader
Noah Hawley
Mike Judge
Chuck Lorre
Seth MacFarlane
Seth Meyers
David Milch
Ryan Murphy
Shonda Rhimes
Shawn Ryan
David Simon
Aaron Sorkin
Rebecca Sugar
Kurt Sutter
Genndy Tartakovsky
Matthew Weiner
Joss Whedon

Actors

Jason Bateman
Zach Braff
Louis C.K.
Dave Chappelle
Glenn Close
Bryan Cranston
Claire Danes
Peter Dinklage
Tina Fey
James Gandolfini
Donald Glover
Jon Hamm
Keegan-Michael Key
John Krasinski
Katherine Langford
Jane Lynch
Elisabeth Moss
Bob Odenkirk
Sandra Oh
Aaron Paul
Sarah Paulson
Jordan Peele
Jesse Plemons
Amy Poehler
Jeffrey Tambor

Hosts

Stephen Colbert
James Corden
Jimmy Fallon
Jimmy Kimmel
Seth Meyers
Conan O'Brien
John Oliver
Jon Stewart

Notable outlets

Terrestrial networks

ABC
CBS
Fox
NBC
PBS
UPN
The WB

Cable/satellite channels

AMC
Cartoon Network
Comedy Central
Disney Channel
ESPN
FX
Hallmark Channel
HBO
IFC
Nickelodeon
Paramount Network 
Showtime
Syfy
TNT
USA

International networks
BBC
CBC Television
RTVE
Chilevisión

Streaming services

Disney+
Hulu
Netflix
Amazon Prime Video
Apple TV+
Crackle
Paramount+
HBO Max

Selected notable and important shows

13 Reasons Why
1923
24
30 for 30
30 Rock
Abbott Elementary
Action
Adventure Time
Agent Carter
Agents of S.H.I.E.L.D.
Altered Carbon
American Crime Story
American Gods
American Horror Story
American Idol
Amphibia
Angel
Arrested Development
Atlanta
Avatar: The Last Airbender
Barry
Battlestar Galactica
Better Call Saul
Better Things
Big City Greens
Big Little Lies
Billions
Black-ish
Black Mirror
Boardwalk Empire
Bob's Burgers
BoJack Horseman
Bosch
Breaking Bad
Broadchurch
Brooklyn Nine-Nine
Burn Notice
Call the Midwife
Channel Zero
Chappelle's Show
Chernobyl
Cobra Kai
Comedians in Cars Getting Coffee
Community
Counterpart
Crazy Ex-Girlfriend
Craig of the Creek
Criminal Minds
Curb Your Enthusiasm
Damages
Damnation
Dancing with the Stars
Daredevil
Dark
Deadwood
Derry Girls
Desperate Housewives
Dexter
Documentary Now!
Dopesick
Downton Abbey
Electric Dreams
Emily in Paris
Empire
Entourage
Episodes
Euphoria
Extras
Family Guy
Fargo
Firefly
Fleabag
Flight of the Conchords
Freaks and Geeks
Fresh Off the Boat
Friday Night Lights
Futurama
Game of Thrones
Gilmore Girls
Girls
Glee
Glow
Gotham
Gravity Falls
Grey's Anatomy
Halt and Catch Fire
Hannibal
Happy Endings
Heroes
Homeland
Home Movies
House
House of Cards
House of the Dragon
How I Met Your Mother
It's Always Sunny in Philadelphia
Jane the Virgin
Jimmy Kimmel Live!
Justified
Killing Eve
La Casa de Papel
Last Tango in Halifax
Longmire
Lost
Louie
Luther
Mad Men
Master of None
Mindhunter
Merlin
Modern Family
Mozart in the Jungle
Mr. Robot
Mr Selfridge
My Little Pony: Friendship is Magic
Narcos
Nathan for You
NCIS
New Girl
Nip/Tuck
Now and Again
Nurse Jackie
Orange Is the New Black
Once Upon a Time
Only Murders in the Building
Outlander
Over the Garden Wall
Ozark
Parks and Recreation
Paw Patrol
Peaky Blinders
Pen15
Penny Dreadful
Phineas and Ferb
Popular
Pose
Primal
Prison Break
Pushing Daisies
Queer as Folk (US) 
Rake
Regular Show
Reservation Dogs
Rick and Morty
Rings of Power
Ripper Street
Rita
Riverdale
Rome
Schitt's Creek
Scrubs
Sense8
Severance
Sex and the City
Shameless (UK) &
Shameless (US)
Shark Tank
Sharp Objects
Sherlock
Six Feet Under
Small Axe
Smallville
Sons of Anarchy
SpongeBob SquarePants
Squid Game
Star vs. The Forces of Evil
Steven Universe
Stranger Things
Studio 60 on the Sunset Strip
Succession
Supernatural
Survivor
Ted Lasso
The Amazing Race
The Amazing World of Gumball
The Americans
The Apprentice
The Bachelor
The Bear
The Big Bang Theory
The Carmichael Show
The Closer
The Colbert Report
The Crown
The Daily Show with Jon Stewart
The Expanse
The Fall
The Good Place
The Good Wife
The Handmaid's Tale
The Killing (US)
The Knick
The L Word
The Last of Us
The Late Late Show with James Corden
The Late Show with Stephen Colbert
The Leftovers
The Legend of Korra
The Magicians
The Man in the High Castle
The Mandalorian
The Marvelous Mrs. Maisel
The Mindy Project
The Morning Show
The Musketeers
The Office (UK) &
The Office (US)
The Owl House
The Paradise
The Romanoffs
The Shield
The Sopranos
The Thick of It
The Tonight Show Starring Jimmy Fallon
The Tudors
The Underground Railroad
The Venture Bros
The Voice
The Walking Dead
The West Wing
The White Lotus
The Wire
Tiger King
Transparent
True Blood
True Detective
Tuca & Bertie
Ugly Betty
Unbreakable Kimmy Schmidt
Veep
Veronica Mars
Vikings
Vinyl
WandaVision
Wander Over Yonder
Watchmen
We Are Lady Parts
We Bare Bears
Weeds
Westworld
Who Wants to Be a Millionaire?
Yellowjackets
Yellowstone
You're the Worst

Pre-1999 shows associated with the contemporary Golden Age

Ally McBeal
Babylon 5
Bakersfield P.D.
Becker
Buffy the Vampire Slayer
Chicago Hope
Doctor Who
Everybody Loves Raymond
Exit 57
Frasier
Frank's Place
Friends
Homicide: Life on the Street
Jeopardy!
Murder One
Mystery Science Theater 3000
Nothing Sacred
Oz
The Practice
Prime Suspect
Relativity
Roc
Roseanne
Saturday Night Live
Seinfeld
South Park
Star Trek: The Next Generation
Star Trek: Deep Space Nine
The Days and Nights of Molly Dodd
The Powerpuff Girls
The Simpsons
The X-Files
Twin Peaks
Wheel of Fortune
Will & Grace

See also

Golden Age of Television (1940s–60s)
Network era
Multi-channel transition
Post-network era
Multichannel television in the United States
Streaming television
1990s in television
2000s in television
2010s in television
2020s in television
Quality television
Adult animation
Binge-watching
Documentary film
Hate-watching
Miniseries
Telenovela
New Hollywood
Indiewood
Cinephilia
Soap opera
Art film
Nerd culture
Marvel and DC Comics
Postmodern television
Game shows

References

External links
We are living in the Golden Age of Television - The Daily Californian
We Are Not In TV's Golden Age - Global Comment
This Decade Was a Golden Age for Reality TV|Glamour
Prestige TV: How to Know You're Watching a "Good" Show on Vulture
13 Rules for Creating Prestige TV Dramas also on Vulture

1990s in American television
2000s in American television
2010s in American television
2020s in American television
Television (2000s-present)
History of television in the United States
Television in the United States
History of television
1990s in television
2000s in television
2010s in television
2020s in television
1990s in animation
2000s in animation
2010s in animation
2020s in animation
1999 establishments in the United States
1999 in animation
Postmodern art